Bvndit (stylized in all caps, pronounced as "Bandit"; acronym for Be Ambitious N Do IT), was a South Korean girl group under MNH Entertainment. The group consisted of five members: Yiyeon, Songhee, Jungwoo, Simyeong, and Seungeun. They made their debut on April 10, 2019, with the single album Bvndit, Be Ambitious!.

History

2019: Debut with Bvndit, Be Ambitious! and Be!
Bvndit became the first girl group ever formed by MNH Entertainment. The group made its debut on April 10 with the single "Hocus Pocus", which is the lead track for its debut digital single album Bvndit, Be Ambitious!. The single album consists of three songs, with the other two being "Be Ambitious!", serving as the introductory track, and "My Error". They made their official debut stage on April 11, 2019, on the music show M Countdown.

On May 15, Bvndit released their second digital single "Dramatic".

Bvndit released their first extended play Be! on November 5 with the lead track "Dumb".

2020: Carnival 
The group released a digital single "Cool" on February 6, 2020, as the first part of MNH Entertainment's new music project New.wav. On May 13, the group released their second EP Carnival.

2021: Girls Planet 999 
From August to September 2021, member Seungeun appeared as a contestant on the Mnet survival show Girls Planet 999, but was eliminated in episode 5 and finished in 21st place in K-Group.

2022: Re-Original and disbandment
After the group's third anniversary in April 2022, they announced that they will make their comeback in May. In May 3, MNH Entertainment announced Bvndit's first comeback in nearly two years, with the release of their third EP Re-Original, set to released on May 25. On November 11, 2022, MNH announced that Bvndit has disbanded and all the members had terminated their contracts.

Members
Adapted from their Naver profile.
 Yiyeon (이연) — Leader
 Songhee (송희)
 Jungwoo (정우) 
 Simyeong (시명)
 Seungeun (승은)

Discography

Extended plays

Single album

Singles

Filmography

Music videos

Awards and nominations

Genie Music Awards

Mnet Asian Music Awards

Notes

References

External links

 BVNDIT at MNH Entertainment 

2019 establishments in South Korea
2022 disestablishments in South Korea
K-pop music groups
Musical groups established in 2019
Musical groups disestablished in 2022
South Korean dance music groups
South Korean girl groups
Musical groups from Seoul